Muscarine, L-(+)-muscarine, or muscarin is a natural product found in certain mushrooms, particularly in Inocybe and Clitocybe species, such as the deadly C. dealbata. Mushrooms in the genera Entoloma and Mycena have also been found to contain levels of muscarine which can be dangerous if ingested. Muscarine has been found in harmless trace amounts in Boletus, Hygrocybe, Lactarius and Russula. Trace concentrations of muscarine are also found in Amanita muscaria, though the pharmacologically more relevant compound from this mushroom is the Z-drug-like alkaloid muscimol. A. muscaria fruitbodies contain a variable dose of muscarine, usually around 0.0003% fresh weight. This is very low and toxicity symptoms occur very rarely. Inocybe and Clitocybe contain muscarine concentrations up to 1.6%.

Muscarine is a nonselective agonist of the muscarinic acetylcholine receptors.

History
The name muscarine derives from that of Amanita muscaria, from which it was first isolated, by German chemists Oswald Schmiedeberg and Richard Koppe at the University of Dorpat, who reported their findings in 1869. The mushroom's specific name in turn comes from the Latin  for fly because the mushroom was often used to attract and catch flies, hence its common name, "fly agaric".

Muscarine was the first parasympathomimetic substance ever studied and causes profound activation of the peripheral parasympathetic nervous system that may end in circulatory collapse and death. Being a quaternary ammonium salt, muscarine is less completely absorbed from the gastrointestinal tract than tertiary amines, and it does not cross the blood–brain barrier.
Muscarinic agonists activate muscarinic receptors while nicotinic agonists activate nicotine receptors. Both are direct-acting cholinomimetics; they produce their effects by binding to and activating cholinergic receptors.
Final proof of the structure was given by Franz Jellinek and colleagues in 1957 with the help of X-ray diffraction analysis; Jellinek further described the three-dimensional structure of the molecule using muscarine chloride. These new findings set into motion research on the pharmacology of muscarine and muscarine-like substances that are structurally related to acetylcholine.

Structure and reactivity
Muscarine mimics the function of the natural neurotransmitter acetylcholine in the muscarinic part of the cholinergic nervous system, despite the less flexible structure due to the five-membered ring in the molecular skeleton. With the exception of the double bonded oxygen, all of the acetylcholine structure is present in the right bottom side of muscarine (see Figure 3 below for comparison of both structures).

There are two mirror forms of muscarine, named: 2S-muscarine and 2R-muscarine.

Efficient synthesis of (+)-muscarine
The scheme below represents a very efficient way of the synthesis of (+)-muscarine according to the scientists Chan and Li in the Canadian journal of Chemistry in 1992.
S-(−)-Ethyl lactate (2)(Figure 4) is converted into the 2,6-dichlorobenzyl ether (3). Diisobutylaluminium hydride (DIBAL) reduction of the 2,6-dichlorobenzyl ether gives the aldehyde (4). Treatment of the crude aldehyde with allyl bromide and zinc powder in water with NH4Cl as catalyst resulted in an anti:syn mixture of 5a and 5b. Treatment of 5a with iodine in CH3CN at 0 °C gives the cyclized product 6a. Finally treatment of 6a with excess trimethylamine in ethanol gave (+)-muscarine (2S,4R,5S). A similar reaction sequence with 5b gave (+)-epimuscarine (7).

Other Syntheses
It can be synthesized in various ways from completely different substances, particularly from 2,5-dimethyl-3-carboxymethyl flurane.

Pharmacology

Pharmacodynamics
Muscarine mimics the action of the neurotransmitter acetylcholine by agonising muscarinic acetylcholine receptors. These receptors were named after muscarine, to differentiate them from the other acetylcholine receptors (nicotinic receptors), which are comparatively unresponsive to muscarine. There are five different types of muscarinic receptors: M1, M2, M3, M4 and M5. Most tissues express a mixture of subtypes.
The M2 and M3 subtypes mediate muscarinic responses at peripheral autonomic tissues. M1 and M4 subtypes are more abundant in brain and autonomic ganglia.
The odd numbered receptors, M1, M3 and M5, interact with Gq proteins to stimulate phosphoinositide hydrolysis and the release of intracellular calcium. Conversely, the even numbered receptors, M2 and M4, interact with Gi proteins to inhibit adenylyl cyclase, which results in a decrease of intracellular concentration of cyclic adenosine monophosphate (cAMP).
Most agonists for muscarine receptors are not selective for subtypes.

Muscarinic receptors also signal via other pathways, for instance via G beta-gamma complex modulation of potassium channels. This allows muscarine to modulate cellular excitability via the membrane potential.

Metabolism 
A paucity of research exists on the metabolism of muscarine in the human body, suggesting this compound is not metabolized by humans. Though there has been extensive research in the field of acetylcholine metabolism by acetylcholinesterase, muscarine is not metabolized by this enzyme, partly explaining the compound's potential toxicity. Muscarine is readily soluble in water. The most likely way for muscarine to leave the blood is via renal clearance; it will eventually leave the body in urine.

Medical uses 

Muscarinic agonists are used as drugs in treating glaucoma, postoperative ileus, congenital megacolon, urinary retention and xerostomia. Muscarine is contraindicated in people with diseases that make them susceptible to parasympathetic stimulation, people who have asthma or COPD, or people who have peptic ulcer disease. Also people with an obstruction in the gastrointestinal or urinary tract are not prescribed muscarine because it will aggravate the obstruction, causing pressure to build up that may lead to perforation.

Efficacy 
As muscarine works on the muscarinic acetylcholine receptor, the best comparison can be made with acetylcholine, which normally works on this receptor. Pure muscarine compared to pure acetylcholine is stated in most cases to be more potent, its action is always slower but longer lasting than acetylcholine. A possible explanation for this long-lasting behavior might be that muscarine does not get hydrolyzed by acetylcholinesterase in the synaptic cleft.

Toxicology 
Muscarine poisoning is characterized by miosis, blurred vision, increased salivation, excessive sweating, lacrimation, bronchial secretions, bronchoconstriction, bradycardia, abdominal cramping, increased gastric acid secretion, diarrhea and polyuria. If muscarine reaches the brain it can cause tremor, convulsions and hypothermia.
Cardiac ventricles contain muscarinic receptors that mediate a decrease in the force of contractions leading to a lower blood pressure. If muscarine is administered intravenously, muscarine can trigger acute circulatory failure with cardiac arrest.
The symptoms of intoxication with mushrooms rich in muscarine, especially Inocybe, are very typical:
The symptoms start early, after one-quarter to two hours, with headache, nausea, vomiting, and constriction of the pharynx. Then salivation, lacrimation, and diffuse perspiration set in, combined with miosis, disturbed accommodation, and reduced vision. Gastric and small bowel colic leads to diarrhea, and there is a painful urge for urination. Bronchoconstriction leads to asthmatic attacks and severe dyspnea, and bradycardia combined with marked hypotension and vasodilation results in circulatory shock. Death after 8 to 9 hours has been reported in about 5% of the cases, but can be avoided completely by prompt administration of IV or IM anticholinergic drugs.

Antidote 
Antimuscarinics such as atropine can be used as an antidote to muscarine. Atropine is, like muscarine, an alkaloid but unlike muscarine is an antagonist of the muscarinic receptors. Hence, it inhibits the effects of acetylcholine.
Muscarinic antagonists dilate the pupil and relax the ciliary muscle, are used in treatment of inflammatory uveitis and is associated with glaucoma.  They are also used to treat urinary incontinence and diseases characterized by bowel hypermotility such as irritable bowel syndrome.
Muscarinic antagonists are often called parasympatholytics because they have the same effect as agents that block postganglionic parasympathetic nerves.

References

External links 
 Treatment of muscarine poisoning
 Psychoactive Amanitas on Erowid

Muscarinic agonists
Mycotoxins
Quaternary ammonium compounds
Alkaloids